The 1971 Rothmans International Quebec, also known as the Quebec International Open or Quebec WCT, was a men's professional tennis tournament that was part of the 1971 World Championship Tennis circuit. It was held on indoor carpet courts at Laval University in Quebec City, Quebec in Canada. It was the inaugural edition of the tournament and was held from 26 July through 1 August 1971. Tom Okker won the singles title and earned $10,000 first-prize money.

Finals

Singles

 Tom Okker defeated  Rod Laver 6–3, 7–6, 6–7, 6–4
 It was Okker's 2nd singles title of the year and the 19th of his career in the Open Era.

Doubles

 Roy Emerson /  Rod Laver defeated  Tom Okker /  Marty Riessen 7–6, 6–2

References

External links
 ITF tournament edition details

Quebec WCT Tournament
Tennis in Canada
1971 in Canadian tennis